The Kootenai Tribe of Idaho (Kutenai language: ʔaq̓anqmi) is a federally recognized tribe of Lower Kootenai people, sometimes called the Idaho Ksanka. The Ktunaxa (Kutenai pron. ), also known as Kutenai, Kootenay (predominant spelling in Canada) and Kootenai (predominant spelling in the United States) are an Indigenous people of the Northwest Plateau.

They are one of five federally recognized tribes in the state of Idaho. The others are Coeur d'Alene, Nez Perce, Shoshone-Bannock, and Duck Valley Indian Reservation (Western Shoshone-Northern Paiute).

Reservation

The Kootenai Reservation was first established in 1896. After subsequent land loss, the reservation was re-established in 1974.

Government
The tribe's headquarters is in Bonners Ferry, Idaho. The tribe is governed by a democratically elected, nine-member tribal council. The current administration is as follows:

 Chairman: Gary FX Aitken Jr.
 Jennifer Porter
 Amethyst Aitken
 Ronald Abraham
 Diane David
 Middle Row: Duane E. Saunders
 Louie Abraham
 Velma Bahe
 Kim Cooper.

Language
Traditionally, Kootenai people have spoken the Kutenai language, a language isolate. It has a dictionary and grammar and is written in the Latin script.

History
The Kootenai people lived along the Kootenai River in Idaho, Montana, and British Columbia. They were hunter-gatherers, and salmon was an important staple to their diets. They have permanent winter villages of cone-shaped houses made from wooden poles and rush mats.

In 1855 the tribe refused to sign a treaty with the US government that would require them to cede their aboriginal lands in Idaho and consolidate with several other smaller tribes in Montana.  The Dawes Act broke up tribal land holdings into individual allotments. Due to illegal land loss, the tribe was awarded $425,000 in a land claims settlement in 1960.

It was enacted by S. 634, signed by President Gerald Ford in October.

Economic development
Since 1986, the Kootenai Tribe has owned and operated the Kootenai River Inn in Bonners Ferry. It is now the Kootenai River Inn Casino and Spa, also has the Springs Restaurant, Casino Deli, the Kootenai Day Spa, and gift shop.

Reservation industries include timber, tourism, and selling sand and gravel. The tribe also owns a sturgeon hatchery.

See also
 Confederated Salish and Kootenai Tribes of the Flathead Nation

Notes

References
 Pritzker, Barry M. A Native American Encyclopedia: History, Culture, and Peoples. Oxford: Oxford University Press, 2000. .

External links
 Kootenai Tribe of Idaho, official website
 "The Kootenai Tribe’s Forgotten War," by Jack McNeel, Idaho Public Television
Kutenai Tales, a 1918 book by anthropologist Franz Boas

Ktunaxa governments
Native American tribes in Idaho
American Indian reservations in Idaho
Geography of Boundary County, Idaho
Federally recognized tribes in the United States
Indigenous peoples of the Northwest Plateau